Douro-Dummer is a township in central-eastern Ontario, Canada, in Peterborough County along the Trent-Severn Waterway. It was formed on January 1, 1998, through the amalgamation of Douro and Dummer Townships.

The township is the site of drumlins known as the Drumlins of Douro, and home of the Warsaw Caves (near the community of Warsaw).

Douro's general store was run by the same family since 1896, Patrick George Towns after moving the store opened in his hometown Peterborough in 1892; however, it closed its doors for the last time in Sunday, September 4, 2016. It was reopened as Towns and Leahy Merchantile and Deli in 2017, but it was destroyed by a fire in 2018.

Local government 
Douro-Dummer is governed by a mayor, deputy-mayor and three councillors. As of the 2018 election, the elected council members are:

Mayor: Heather Watson

Deputy Mayor: Harold Nelson

Councillor at Large: Thomas G. Watt

Councillors:

 Ward 1: Ray Johnston
 Ward 2: Adam Vervoort

Communities
The township comprises the communities of:

 Centre Dummer
 Clarina 
 Cottesloe 
 Crowes Landing
 Donwood
 Douro
 Five Corners - referring to convergence of Douro Seventh Line, Nassau Road and Peterborough County Road 4
 Galesburg - south of Clear Lake
 Gilchrist Bay - waterway within Stoney Lake
 Guerin - along Indian River
 Hall's Glen
 Juniper Island - on Ston(e)y Lake
 McCrackens Landing
 South Beach
 South Dummer
 Warsaw - south end of Quarry Lake and seat of municipal government
 Young's Point

Demographics 

Notable people
Ronnie Hawkins, American-born Canadian musician, Rockabilly Legend (resident 1970-2017)
Leahy, Canadian folk rock band (family homestead)
Susanna Moodie 1803-1885, Pioneer, English-born Canadian writer and newspaper editor (former resident 1832-1840)
Catharine Parr Traill 1802-1899, Pioneer, English-born Canadian writer, naturalist and sister of Susanna Moodie (former resident 1832-1840)

See also
List of townships in Ontario

References

External links

Lower-tier municipalities in Ontario
Municipalities in Peterborough County
Township municipalities in Ontario